Tserenjavyn Ölziibayar (born 2 May 1946) is a Mongolian former sports shooter. He competed at the 1972 Summer Olympics and the 1976 Summer Olympics.

References

External links
 

1946 births
Living people
Mongolian male sport shooters
Olympic shooters of Mongolia
Shooters at the 1972 Summer Olympics
Shooters at the 1976 Summer Olympics
Place of birth missing (living people)
20th-century Mongolian people